Schuyler is a Dutch surname which, along with many variants, including Schuller, is an adaptation of the German name Schüler.

The name was introduced to North America by 17th-century settlers arriving in New York City. It later became a given name in honor of prominent members of New York's Schuyler family such as Philip Schuyler, and so became the given name of Schuyler Colfax, the 17th vice president of the United States.

As a given name, it is used in the United States for both boys and girls, typically with the alternative phonetic spellings Skylar and Skyler. Skylar was the 479th most common name for boys born in the United States in 2007, and the 171st most common name for girls born there in that year. The spelling Skyler was the 271st most common name for boys born in the United States in 2007, and the 374th most popular name for girls. The spelling Schuyler last ranked among the top 1,000 names for boys in the United States in 1994, when it was at 974th place on the charts.

People with the surname
 Arent Schuyler (1662–1730), American surveyor
 Angelica Schuyler Church (1756–1814), eldest daughter of Philip Schuyler, sister of Elizabeth Schuyler Hamilton, and a prominent member of the social elite
 Cortlandt V. R. Schuyler (1900–1993), U.S. army general
 David Pieterse Schuyler (1636–1690), Dutch colonist in New Netherland
 Elizabeth Schuyler Hamilton (1757–1854), wife of American founding father Alexander Hamilton and founder of the New York Orphan Asylum Society
 Eugene Schuyler (1840–1890), American writer, explorer and diplomat
 George Schuyler (1895–1977), African-American author and journalist
 George W. Schuyler (1810–1885), NYS Treasurer 1864–1865
 James Schuyler (1923–1991), American poet
 Linda Schuyler (born 1948), Canadian television producer
 Molly Schuyler (born 1967), American competitive eater
 Montgomery Schuyler (1843–1914), influential critic, journalist and editorial writer in New York City (art, literature, music and architecture)
 Pieter Schuyler (1657–1724), first mayor of Albany, New York
 Peter Schuyler (New Jersey soldier) (1710–1762), Dutch farmer
 Philip Schuyler (1733–1804), American Revolution general and US senator
 Philip Jeremiah Schuyler (1768–1835), U.S. congressman, son of Philip Schuyler
 Philip Pieterse Schuyler (1628–1683), Dutch colonist in New Netherland
 Philippa Schuyler (1931–1967), pianist and daughter of George Schuyler
 Robert Livingston Schuyler (1883–1966), American historian
 Walter S. Schuyler (1850–1932), first commander of the United States Army Pacific Command

People with the given name

Schuylar 
 Schuylar Oordt (born 1987), American football tight end
 Schuylar Croom, band member of He Is Legend

Schuyler 
 Schuyler Bailar (born 1996), American swimmer
 S. Otis Bland (Schuyler Otis Bland, 1872–1950), U.S. Congressman from Virginia
 Schuyler Colfax (1823–1885), U.S. Vice President from 1869 to 1873
 Schuyler Erle (born 1977), American software developer
 Schuyler Merritt (1853–1953), U.S. Congressman from Connecticut
 Schuyler M. Meyer (1885–1970), New York politician
 Schuyler Wheeler (1860–1923), American engineer, inventor of the electric fan
 Schuyler Grant (born 1970), American actress
 Schuyler Fisk (born 1982), American actress

See also
 Skylar (disambiguation), includes list of people with given name Skylar

References

English-language unisex given names
Surnames of Dutch origin